Joaquin Burdado is a 1988 Filipino fantasy action film written and directed by comic book writer Carlo J. Caparas and starring Ramon Revilla as the titular character, alongside Tanya Gomez, Janice Jurado, Deborah Sun, Paquito Diaz and Rocco Montalban. Produced by Caparas' Golden Lion Films, it was released on May 19, 1988.

Critic Lav Diaz gave Joaquin Burdado a negative review, criticizing the film's dialogue, costume design, lighting, sound design, the performances of the supporting cast and the silly ("kenkoy") climactic fight scene, though he singled out praise for the animation of tattoos coming to life.

Cast

Ramon Revilla as Joaquin Burdado
Tanya Gomez
Janice Jurado
Deborah Sun
Paquito Diaz
Rocco Montalban
Renato del Prado
Johnny Vicar
Danny Riel
Danny Labra
Sanny Erang
Gwen Colmenares
Angelo Villegas
Fred Moro
Elvis Gutierrez

Release
Joaquin Burdado was released on May 19, 1988.

Critical response
Lav Diaz, writing for the Manila Standard, gave the film a negative review. Though he found the action scenes and the animation of Joaquin's tattoos coming to life to be good, he criticized the film's dialogue, lighting, costume design, sound design and the supporting cast's performances. Diaz also questioned why Joaquin's escape from prison did not make the authorities look for him throughout the rest of the film, and further criticized the climactic action scene between Joaquin and the villain to be silly ("kenkoy").

Television remake
In 2008, a television remake titled Joaquin Bordado was broadcast on GMA, with Robin Padilla as the titular character.

References

External links

1988 films
1988 fantasy films
Filipino-language films
Films shot in Metro Manila
Films with live action and animation
Philippine action films
Philippine fantasy films